Helagsfjället, the mountain of Helags, is a mountain in Härjedalen, Sweden, and is part of the Scandinavian Mountains. The peak reaches 1,797 metres above sea level, which makes it the highest mountain in Sweden south of the Arctic Circle. Its glacier is the country's southernmost.

References 
 Petter Bjørstad: Mountains in Sweden

Notes 

Mountains of Sweden
Härjedalen
Landforms of Jämtland County